Sovima is a village located in Chümoukedima District of Nagaland, India and is a suburb of Chümoukedima, the district headquarters. As of 2011 census, Sovima had a total population of 1839 inhabitants.

History
Sovima was founded in 1966.

Demographics
Sovima is situated in Chümoukedima District of Nagaland. As per the Population Census 2011, there are total 374 families residing in Sovima. The total population of Sovima is 1839.

Education
Colleges
 Tetso College

Universities
 ICFAI University

Sports
The Nagaland Cricket Association Stadium is located in Sovima.

See also
Chümoukedima District

References

Cities and towns in Chümoukedima district